Akçakiraz (former Perçenç, from the original Armenian Parchanj []) is a belde (town) in the central district (Elazığ District) of Elazığ Province, Turkey. Its population is 8,047 (2021). 

The town is populated by both Kurds and Turks. It consists of 10 quarters: Paşalar, Kıraç, Yenice, Hürriyet, Kültür, Yeşilyurt, Yüzbaşı, Yeşilkuşak, Zafer and Bahçekapı.

History 
According to the official municipality page the town was founded in 1670 by a certain İsmail Bey who was probably a member of Karakoyunlu dynasty (which had founded a short lived Turkmen empire in the 14th and 15th centuries). Local Armenian tradition held that the town was founded by the Apostles Thaddeus and Bartholomew, patron saints of the Armenian Church. While the author of a study on the village finds this story to be apocryphal, he believes Armenians were the original founders of the village. All the Armenians were expelled or massacred during the course of the Armenian genocide of 1915.

References

Populated places in Elazığ Province
Towns in Turkey
Elazığ District
Kurdish settlements in Elazığ Province